The Peoples Power Action Party is a political party in the Solomon Islands.  The party was launched on February 10, 2010 to support the "underprivileged majority". Its founding president is Wale Feratelia.

The party advocates the foundation of a micro-finance bank to finance development in the Solomon Islands.

References

Political parties in the Solomon Islands
Political parties established in 2010
2010 establishments in the Solomon Islands